Blue Murder is a Canadian crime drama television series, featuring stories that reflected the turbulence of urban life and the crimes that make headlines. The Blue Murder squad members were an elite group of big-city investigators out to solve some of the city's most complicated and riveting crimes.

Plot 
Blue Murder is about a group of police detectives trying to solve murders in Toronto.

Episodes

Cast 
 Mimi Kuzyk as Deputy Chief-of-Police Kay Barrow
 Joel S. Keller as Det. Ed Oosterhuis
 Jeremy Ratchford	as Det. Jack Pogue (2001–2003)
 Maria del Mar as Insp. Victoria Castillo (2001–2002)
 Catherine Black as Andrea Cowlings (2001)
 John Boylan as the Deputy Chief of Police Talbot
 Maurice Dean Wint	as Cpl. Nathaniel Sweet (2002)
 Benz Antoine as Det. Jim Weeks (2003–2004)
 Tamara Hickey as Det. Karen Gilliam (2003)
 Kari Matchett as Det. Elaine Bender (2004)
 Tracy Waterhouse as Det. Ronnie Stahl (2004)

Story department 
 Steve Lucas – Co-Creator, Executive Producer, Writer
 Cal Coons – Co-Creator, Executive Story Editor, Writer
 Jill Golick – Executive Story Editor, Writer
 David Barlow – Executive Story Editor, Writer

Home media 
While the British crime drama of the same title has been released on DVD, the Canadian Blue Murder television series has not been released on DVD.

External links 

 

2001 Canadian television series debuts
2004 Canadian television series endings
2000s Canadian crime drama television series
Detective television series
Canadian police procedural television series
Global Television Network original programming
Television series by Entertainment One
Television series by Corus Entertainment
Television shows filmed in Toronto
Television shows set in Toronto